Hebenstretia is a genus of flowering plants in the family Scrophulariaceae, native to Africa. They are annual or perennial herbs or shrubs, found in mesic habitats.

Species
Currently accepted species include:

Hebenstretia angolensis Rolfe
Hebenstretia anomala Roessler
Hebenstretia comosa Hochst.
Hebenstretia cordata L.
Hebenstretia dentata L.
Hebenstretia dregei Rolfe
Hebenstretia dura Choisy
Hebenstretia fastigiosa Jaroscz
Hebenstretia glaucescens Schltr.
Hebenstretia hamulosa E.Mey.
Hebenstretia holubii Rolfe
Hebenstretia integrifolia L.
Hebenstretia kamiesbergensis Roessler
Hebenstretia lanceolata (E.Mey.) Rolfe
Hebenstretia minutiflora Rolfe
Hebenstretia namaquensis Roessler
Hebenstretia neglecta Roessler
Hebenstretia oatesii Rolfe
Hebenstretia paarlensis Roessler
Hebenstretia parviflora E.Mey.
Hebenstretia ramosissima Jaroscz
Hebenstretia rehmannii Rolfe
Hebenstretia repens Jaroscz
Hebenstretia robusta E.Mey.
Hebenstretia sarcocarpa Bolus ex Rolfe

References

Scrophulariaceae
Scrophulariaceae genera